Quezon City's 1st congressional district is one of the six congressional districts of the Philippines in Quezon City. It has been represented in the House of Representatives of the Philippines since 1987. The district consists of the western barangays bordering Manila and the southern enclave of Caloocan, and to the north of Quezon Avenue. The neighborhoods of La Loma, San Francisco del Monte and Santa Mesa Heights are in this district. It is currently represented in the 19th Congress by Arjo Atayde of the Nacionalista Party (NP).

Representation history

Election results

2010

2013

2016

2019

2022

See also
Legislative districts of Quezon City

References

Congressional districts of the Philippines
Politics of Quezon City
1987 establishments in the Philippines
Congressional districts of Metro Manila
Constituencies established in 1987